John F. Kennedy Public School is located in Sector 28, Faridabad, India. It is a CBSE affiliated school established in 1993.

See also
 List of memorials to John F. Kennedy

Notes

External links
 Official Website

Schools in Faridabad
Educational institutions established in 1993
1993 establishments in Haryana